The Executive Minister of the Iglesia ni Cristo is the primary leader of the Philippine-based Christian denomination, the Iglesia ni Cristo.

There has been three Executive Ministers of the church since the Iglesia's founding in 1914 and all of them came from the Manalo family. The Executive Minister serves a life tenure. The Deputy Executive Minister assumes the duties of Executive Minister during the latter's absence and succeeds him when he (Executive Minister) dies or retires. For example, the current Executive Minister, Eduardo V. Manalo was elected Deputy Executive Minister by the INC District Ministers, also known as the Division Ministers in 1994.

The Executive Minister along with Deputy Executive Minister and 11 other Senior Ministers (The Sanggunian or Church Economic Council) forms the Church's Central Administration.

List of Executive Ministers

References

Executive minister
Members of Iglesia ni Cristo
Ecclesiastical titles
Religious leadership roles